Wheeling Township, Ohio may refer to:
Wheeling Township, Belmont County, Ohio
Wheeling Township, Guernsey County, Ohio

Ohio township disambiguation pages